is a passenger railway station located in the city of Sakado, Saitama, Japan, operated by the private railway operator Tōbu Railway.

Lines
Express, Semi express, and Local services stop at this station. During the daytime, the station is served by six trains per hour in each direction.

Station layout
The station consists of a single island platform serving two tracks. The station building is located above the platforms.

Platforms

Adjacent stations

History
The station opened on 21 August 1973. From 17 March 2012, station numbering was introduced on the Tobu Tojo Line, with Kita-Sakado Station becoming "TJ-27".

Passenger statistics
In fiscal 2019, the station was used by an average of 20,020 passengers daily.

Surrounding area

Civic
 "Orumo" Sakado Civic Culture Centre

Education

 Sakado School for the Deaf
 Saitama Prefectural Sakado High School
 Sakura Junior High School
 Sakado Elementary School
 Kita-Sakado Elementary School

Rivers
 Oppegawa River
 Komagawa River

Bus services
The east side of the station is served by the "Sakacchi Bus" (Ōya Line) and "Sakacchi Wagon" (Maguro Line & Shigaichi Line) community minibus services operated by the city of Sakado.

See also
 List of railway stations in Japan

References

External links

 Kita-Sakado Station information (Tobu) 

Railway stations in Saitama Prefecture
Stations of Tobu Railway
Tobu Tojo Main Line
Railway stations in Japan opened in 1973
Sakado, Saitama